Francis Zé (born 15 January 1982) is a Cameroonian footballer.

Biography
Zé started his professional career with Sampdoria. In February 2001 along with Thomas Job and Jean Ondoa were investigated by FIGC for alleged falsification of documents in order to treat as a European Union citizen. In July 2001, they were banned for 6 months. In February 2002, he was loaned to Cremonese along with Ondoa.

In 2002-03 season Zé returned to Genoa and made his Serie B debut on 24 May 2003, replaced Andrea Rabito in the 80th minutes.

In 2004-05 season he left for Swiss Challenge League side Chiasso (but also from Italian speaking region), played 16 times.

In January 2007 he left for Red Star Waasland but his contract was not extended at the end of season.

In February 2004, he scored a goal for Cameroon Olympic team at 2004 CAF Men's Pre-Olympic Tournament.

Honours
Serie B: 2003

References

External links
 Profile at Swiss Football League 
 Profile at Lega Calcio web site 

Cameroonian footballers
Cameroonian expatriate footballers
Serie B players
Swiss Challenge League players
U.C. Sampdoria players
U.S. Cremonese players
FC Chiasso players
Expatriate footballers in Italy
Expatriate footballers in Switzerland
Expatriate footballers in Belgium
Association football midfielders
1982 births
Living people